Packaging most often refers to packaging and labeling, including

Specialised packaging 
Active packaging, packaging systems to help extend shelf life, monitor freshness, display information on quality, improve safety, and improve convenience**Self-heating food packaging, active packaging with the ability to heat food contents without external heat sources or power
Blister packaging,  pre-formed plastic packaging used for small goods
Child-resistant packaging, packaging used to reduce the risk of children ingesting hazardous materials
Cosmetic packaging, cosmetic containers and secondary packaging of cosmetic products
Currency packaging, forms of packing money for easy handling and counting
Electronic packaging, enclosures and protective features in electronic devices
Dual in-line package, an electronic component package
Integrated circuit packaging, final stage in construction of an integrated circuit
Quilt packaging, an integrated circuit packaging
Wafer-level packaging, packaging an integrated circuit while still part of the wafer
Food packaging, packaging for food
Disposable food packaging, comprises disposable items often found in food service
Luxury packaging, the design, research, development, and manufacturing of packaging, displays, and for luxury brands
Modified atmosphere packaging
Optical disc packaging, the packaging that accompanies CDs, DVDs, and other formats of optical discs
Spindle (disc packaging), plastic container for packaging optical discs
Pharmaceutical packaging, packages and the packaging processes for pharmaceutical preparations
Unit dose packaging
Plain tobacco packaging, particular packaging of tobacco products
Resealable packaging, packaging that allows the consumer or user to reseal or reclose the packaging
Reusable packaging, packaging from durable materials and is specifically designed for multiple trips
Shelf-ready packaging, packaging that supports the store staff in terms of the selection of the right products
Sustainable packaging, an environmental considerations for packaging
Tube (container), a collapsible package which can be used for viscous liquids
Vacuum packaging, packaging that removes air from the package prior to sealing
Video game packaging, physical storage of the contents of a PC or console game

Packaging may also refer to:

Biology 
Coronavirus packaging signal, in molecular biology
DNA packaging
Retroviral Psi packaging element, in molecular biology

Design and sales 
Dynamic packaging, in package holiday bookings
Form factor (design), the size, shape, and other physical specifications of components
Packaging engineering, topic ranging from design conceptualization to product placement
Seasonal packaging, marketing a product by wrapping the product in a package closely related to seasons or holidays

Media 
Book packaging, publishing activity
Movie packaging, in the film industry
Packaging Digest, business magazine
Packaging World, business magazine

Technology 
Packaging & Deployment, of software
XML-binary Optimized Packaging, in XML software

Other uses 
Information packaging
Salary packaging, Australian term for manipulation of employee benefits

See also 
Package (disambiguation)
Packing (disambiguation)